Kesić is a Serbian surname. Notable people with the surname include:

Aleksandar Kesić (born 1987), Serbian footballer
Zoran Kesić (born 1976), Serbian TV presenter 

Serbian surnames